Mountville is an unincorporated community in the Loudoun Valley of Loudoun County, Virginia.  The village is situated on Snickersville Turnpike halfway between Aldie and Philomont at the intersection of Mountville Road.

Mountville is located on a promontory between the main branch of the Goose Creek and its tributary, Beaverdam Creek, at the western base of Catoctin Mountain.

Despite its geographic location, Mountville is named, not for its elevation, but rather for Ezekial Mount, who first settled the area in 1797, after moving to Loudoun from Mountville, Pennsylvania.  The village was officially christened Mountville in 1817 with the establishment of a post office in the village bearing that name.

Mountville was the scene of early skirmishing during the American Civil War Battle of Unison

Unincorporated communities in Loudoun County, Virginia
Washington metropolitan area
Unincorporated communities in Virginia